Jonathon "Jon" Allen is an English singer-songwriter born in Winchester, currently living in London. His debut album Dead Man's Suit was released in 2009. With his fourth studio album 'Blue Flame', he has amassed five million plays on Spotify.

Early life
Jon Allen was born in 1977 in Winchester where he grew up, while he was attending Sands School in South Devon. It was there that he began playing the drums and guitar. When he was 15, he started recording songs on a cassette-based four-track machine. On leaving school Allen attended college completing a BTEC in performing arts. Whilst performing in various local bands he auditioned and was accepted at the Liverpool Institute of Performing Arts (LIPA). This is where he met Paul McCartney, who encouraged him to continue as a songwriter.

Career
Following his graduating from LIPA, Allen moved to London, after one of his demos received a five-star review in the magazine Making Music. Management offers in London soon followed. There, a gig circuit was performed where Allen met members of his future band including Hammond organ player Rich Milner, who Allen spotted at a gig in South London. Milner introduced Allen to Tristan Longworth who went on to produce and record his debut album, Dead Man's Suit.

In a 2018 interview, Jon Allen revealed that his main source of inspiration in his songwriting is Bob Dylan, while his musical style (particularly in the Blue Flame) have been influenced by the compositions of Stevie Wonder, Marvin Gaye, Al Green and Bill Withers.

Allen has toured with Dionne Warwick, Emmylou Harris, Mark Knopfler, KT Tunstall, Seal, Graham Parker and Damien Rice among others.

Debut album
The song "Going Home" featured on the worldwide Land Rover TV commercial in 2008 bringing him wider recognition. In 2009, Allen signed with Absolute Distribution and released his debut album Dead Man's Suit. Shortly after this Allen signed a publishing deal with Wardlaw Music.

Side projects
As a founder member of northern soul production team, The Third Degree, he co-produced and sung one of the most widely recognised cover versions of the Duffy song Mercy.

TV appearances and radio broadcasts
Appearance on The Quay Sessions BBC Scotland (2018)
Appearance on Vintage TV Live Sessions (2015)
Appearance on The Late Late Show on RTÉ (2015)
Appearance on Later... with Jools Holland on BBC Two on 15 May 2009.
"Last Orders" performed live to close Glastonbury Festival (2011)
Appeared live at Pinkpop Festival the Netherlands (2009)

TV and film syncs
Loving Arms appeared in the 2018 film What They Had starring Hilary Swank 
In Your Light appeared in the South Korean TV drama series Live (2018)
Get What's Mine appeared in the 2016 comedy drama film Army of One starring Nicolas Cage 
Joanna appeared in the 2013 romantic drama thriller Safe Haven and the Showtime drama series Homeland
Sweet Defeat and Joanna appeared in the 2013 Fox sit-com  The Goodwin Games 
Sweet Defeat appeared in the 2011 comedy drama The Oranges
When The Morning Comes featuring Amy Smith appeared in the drama series Bones

Spotify
In 2018 'Keep On Walking' was added to Spotify's 'A Perfect Day' playlist.

Discography

Studio albums
Dead Man's Suit (2009)
Sweet Defeat (2011) 
Deep River (2014)
Blue Flame (2018)
...meanwhile (2021)

Singles

References

External links

 Official website

1977 births
Living people
English male singer-songwriters
English male guitarists
English rock singers
English rock guitarists
Alumni of the Liverpool Institute for Performing Arts
Musicians from London
21st-century English singers
21st-century British guitarists
21st-century British male singers